Vjekoslav Tomić (born 19 July 1983) is a Croatian football goalkeeper who most recently played for Turkish club Şanlıurfaspor.

Career
On 13 January 2014 Tomić signed for Khazar Lankaran in the Azerbaijan Premier League on a one-year contract.

Career statistics

References

External links
  
 
 

1983 births
Living people
Footballers from Split, Croatia
Croatian footballers
Croatian expatriate footballers
Association football goalkeepers
RNK Split players
NK Međimurje players
HNK Hajduk Split players
Kardemir Karabükspor footballers
FC Sheriff Tiraspol players
Khazar Lankaran FK players
FC Koper players
Şanlıurfaspor footballers
Croatian Football League players
Slovenian PrvaLiga players
Süper Lig players
Moldovan Super Liga players
Azerbaijan Premier League players
Expatriate footballers in Turkey
Expatriate footballers in Moldova
Expatriate footballers in Azerbaijan
Expatriate footballers in Slovenia
Croatian expatriate sportspeople in Turkey
Croatian expatriate sportspeople in Azerbaijan
Croatian expatriate sportspeople in Slovenia
Croatian expatriate sportspeople in Moldova